Martyr's Memorial A-Division League (Nepali: शहीद स्मारक ए- डिभिजन लिग; formerly known as the Kathmandu League Championship) is the top tier of football in Nepal. Contested by 12 to 16 clubs, it operates on a system of promotion and relegation within the Martyr's Memorial B-Division League. The season usually runs from November to March with every team playing each other twice. It is officially known as the Qatar Airways Martyr's Memorial A-Division League.

A new Nepal National League was created in 2011 to give chance to compete A level tournaments to the clubs outside Kathmandu valley. There were 9 clubs competing in the National League, 5 of which are teams of Martyr's Memorial A-Division League.

History of the league
Prime minister Padma Shumsher started the Ram Janaki Football tournament in 1934 with the objective of solidifying the increasing public interest in football. After the establishment of democracy in 1950, the Nepali Police Force had initial successes, enjoying consecutive hat-trick wins and monopolizing the trophy for several years. The Nepal Football Association received the trophy from them, continuing the tournament in remembrance of national martyrs. The trophy is presented today to the winners of the "Martyr's Memorial League Tournament".

RCT won the trophy three subsequent times (1971–73). 1973 saw the formation of the All Nepal Football Association (ANFA), and the tournament continued under new authority, although there have been periodic stoppages due to financial and other reasons. (For instance, the political and economic turmoil of the 1990s stopped the tournament for several years.) League president, Ganesh Thapa, at one time revived ANFA (in 1995), but could not continue it for long. Complying with other football power nation rules, Nepal made ANFA its base for selecting the national teams, although the league still struggled to continue going into the 21st century. Financial problems has caused many football clubs to fold and some to postpone their participation with the most recent being New Road Team, which is the oldest club in Nepal.

Media coverage

For the 2021/22 season ANFA deals with Nepal's popular TV channel Kantipur Television and Kantipur Cineplex to broadcast live. From 2nd round Kantipur TV was also streaming A Division League on YouTube platform.

Now, this season 2023 Space 4k tv and it's YouTube channel is going to broadcast and stream A Division matches.

Teams

Current teams 
The following 14 teams will compete in the Martyr's Memorial A-Division League in the 2022–23 season, with two teams promoted from the B-Division.

Champions 
Since the start of the league, 16 different clubs have won the title in 44 tournaments. Manang Marshyangdi Club have the most (8 titles) under their belt. Machhindra Football Club are the current champions.

Championships by team

A-Division clubs in Asia 
Martyr's Memorial A-Division clubs participated in the AFC President's Cup from its foundation in 2005 till its dissolution in 2014. Since 2015, the winners of the Martyr's Memorial A-Division League qualify for the AFC Cup. A-Division clubs could also qualify for the Asian Club Championship before 2004.

AFC President's Cup

AFC Cup

Asian Club Championship

Notes

See also 
 Nepal Super League
 Nepal National League

References

External links
FIFA.com – Football at the heart of the Himalayas

 
2
Sports leagues established in 1954
Top level football leagues in Asia
1954 establishments in Nepal